National Highway 751DD, commonly referred to as NH 751DD is a national highway in India. It is a secondary route of National Highway 51.  NH-751DD runs in the state of Gujarat in India.

Route 
NH751DD connects Tarapur, Sojitra, Piplav, Sunav and Bandhani Chowk in the state of Gujarat.

Junctions  
 
  Terminal near Tarapur.

See also 
 List of National Highways in India
 List of National Highways in India by state

References

External links 

 NH 751DD on OpenStreetMap

National highways in India
National Highways in Gujarat